Kammanahalli is a suburb located in the north-eastern part of the city of Bangalore. It is bound by HBR Layout, Banaswadi and Lingarajapuram. The locality has been described as a "cosmopolitan hub" in recent years, and earned the nickname "Kammanhattan". Kammanahalli has seen a rise in commercial activity, with retail shops, eateries and educational institutions in the locality increasing in number.

References

External links

Neighbourhoods in Bangalore